Cillium can refer to :

 the Roman North African city Cillium, or Colonia Cillilana, modern Kasserine in Tunisia and the Latin Catholic titular see Cillium
 Cilium, an organelle

See also 
 Caput Cilla, Ancient city and titular see in present Algeria